The United States U-17 women's national soccer team is a youth soccer team operated under the auspices of U.S. Soccer. Its primary role is the development of players in preparation for the senior national team. The team's most recent major tournament was the 2018 FIFA U-17 Women's World Cup, in which the United States team did not advance out of group play. The team competes in a variety of competitions, including the biennial FIFA U-17 Women's World Cup, which is the top competition for this age group.

History

2002–2005
The women's U-17 program was started in 2002 and was initially focused on developing players for the U-19 team. The U-17s played their first matches in November 2002, including a 3–0 victory over Scotland. Through 2003, the U-17s went undefeated in international matches, defeating youth teams from Canada and Germany, and repeated that feat in 2004. In 2005, however, the U-17s suffered defeats in matches against the Canadian and Mexican youth teams.

In 2006, the U-17s competed against various youth teams from Argentina and Germany, including a loss to Argentina's senior team.

2007–2008
In February 2007, FIFA began organizing for the inaugural FIFA U-17 Women's World Cup in New Zealand. In preparation for the tournament, the U-17s posted a 9–1–0 record, defeating U-17 teams from Germany and Uruguay and U-19 teams from Denmark, England and Argentina.

In 2008, the U-17s compiled a record of 19–3–2 and 11–2–1 in international matches, winning the CONCACAF Women's U-17 Championship in Trinidad and Tobago on July 26, 2008, defeating Costa Rica 4–1.

At the 2008 FIFA U-17 Women's World Cup, the United States lost their opening match to Japan. They scraped through the opening rounds of play with a draw against France, and advanced through the tournament to the final, where they lost in overtime to North Korea. Taylor Vancil was named the best goalkeeper at the tournament. Out of the 13 goals that the US had at the tournament, only three players actually scored them: Vicki DiMartino (5), Courtney Verloo (4), and Kristie Mewis (2). The other two goals were own goals by Paraguay and North Korea.

2009–2010
The U-17s were favored to win the 2010 CONCACAF Women's U-17 Championship held in Costa Rica, winning their group and scoring 32 goals. However, they suffered a stunning loss to Canada in the semifinals, on a penalty shootout. This loss prevented the United States from qualifying to the 2010 FIFA U-17 Women's World Cup, the first time in history that a United States women's national soccer team has not advanced out of their region to a Women's World Cup.

2011–2012
In 2011, Albertin Montoya took over the U-17 squad, intent on developing a more possession style of play.  The team started out the cycle slow against powerhouses Germany and Japan, going 1–1–2 in a set of friendlies, but eventually found their form and dominated the 2012 CONCACAF Women's U-17 Championship, outscoring their opposition 26–0 on their way to winning the tournament and qualifying for the 2012 FIFA U-17 Women's World Cup.  Summer Green set a record with 12 goals, the most by an American player during any CONCACAF qualifying tournament.

However, the World Cup would not be kind to the Americans, as despite not losing a match, they would not make it out of their group.  A series of draws between the US, eventual runners-up France, and North Korea meant that the two teams to advance would be decided by total goal differential against the fourth team in the group, Gambia.  The US's 6–0 win turned out not to be enough when North Korea sat deep in their own half to protect a draw, knowing they had scored 11 goals on Gambia, and France, knowing it was on the brink of elimination, pressed the outmatched Gambians to score 6 times in the final 20 minutes to turn a 4–2 match in the 70th minute into a 10–2 rout.

2013–2014
In 2013, B. J. Snow took over the U-17 squad for the 2014 World Cup Cycle.  The cycle started out with great hope and expectations, but in a manner almost identical to 4 years before, the US saw itself unable to qualify for the 2014 FIFA U-17 Women's World Cup when they lost in the semifinals of the 2013 CONCACAF Women's U-17 Championship to Mexico in a penalty shootout despite having only given up one goal in the entire tournament.

Competitive record

FIFA U-17 Women's World Cup

CONCACAF Women's U-17 Championship

Fixtures and results

Legend

2022

2023

Coaches
  Erica Walsh (2004–2006)
  Kazbek Tambi (2006–2010)
  Michael Dickey (2010–2011)
  Albertin Montoya (2011–2012)
  B. J. Snow (2013–2017)
  Mark Carr (2017–2018)
  Tracey Kevins (2019–2021)
  Natalia Astrain (2021–present)

Players

Current squad
20 players were called up for the 2023 February Camp. 

Caps and goals are current as of February 18, 2023, after match against .

Recent call-ups
The following players have been called up in the past 12 months.

See also
 United States women's national soccer team
 United States women's national under-20 soccer team

References

External links
 

Youth soccer in the United States
Soc
Women's national under-17 association football teams
North American women's national under-17 association football teams
U17
U17